The Old White Lion is a public house at 6 Bolton Street, Bury, Greater Manchester BL9 0LQ.

It is on the Campaign for Real Ale's National Inventory of Historic Pub Interiors.

It was built in the late 19th century.

References

Pubs in Greater Manchester
National Inventory Pubs
Buildings and structures in Bury, Greater Manchester